Pokrovka is a rural locality (a selo) and the administrative centre of Pokrovsky Selsoviet, Blagoveshchensky District, Bashkortostan, Russia. The population was 455 as of 2010. There are 6 streets.

Geography 
Pokrovka is located 40 km northeast of Blagoveshchensk (the district's administrative centre) by road. Klyuchi is the nearest rural locality.

References 

Rural localities in Blagoveshchensky District